Kut-e Abdollah is a city and capital of Karun County, Khuzestan Province, Iran. On 23 January 2013, Kut-e Abdollah village was merged with the villages of Khazami, Darvishabad, Shariati-ye Yek, Kut-e Navaser, Kuy-e Montazeri, Gavmishabad, Gondamakar and Hadiabad and created a city. The population of the city in 2006 population census was 64,546 in 11,853 families.

References 

Populated places in Karun County
Cities in Khuzestan Province